Bellvitge is a Rodalies de Catalunya commuter rail station serving the neighborhood of the same name, in the L'Hospitalet de Llobregat municipality, to the south-west of Barcelona, in Catalonia, Spain. Some trains on regional line  also call at the station.

In October 2007, the construction works of the Madrid–Barcelona high-speed rail line in Barcelona's southern access, which runs through an underground route parallel to the conventional line in L'Hospitalet de Llobregat, caused a partial sudden collapse of one of the station's platforms. Due to precedent ground subsidence in the area, the station was shut down as a preventive measure at the moment it occurred, so that there were neither fatalities nor injured people.

Gornal station, served by Barcelona Metro line 8 and several commuter rail services, is located adjacent to Bellvitge station, on the east side of it, allowing for street-level transfers between the two stations.

References

External links
 
 Bellvitge listing at the Rodalies de Catalunya website
 Information and photos of the station at trenscat.cat 
 Video on train operations at the station on YouTube

Rodalies de Catalunya stations
Railway stations in L'Hospitalet de Llobregat
Railway stations in Spain opened in 1977

ca:Estació de Bellvitge/Gornal
es:Estación de Bellvitge